Croatian cuisine is heterogeneous and is known as a cuisine of the regions, since every region of Croatia has its own distinct culinary tradition. Its roots date back to ancient times. The differences in the selection of foodstuffs and forms of cooking are most notable between those in mainland and those in coastal regions. Mainland cuisine is more characterized by the earlier Slavic and the more recent contacts with Hungarian and Turkish cuisine, using lard for cooking, and spices such as black pepper, paprika, and garlic. The coastal region bears the influences of Greek and Roman cuisine, as well as of the later Mediterranean cuisine, in particular Italian (especially Venetian). Coastal cuisines use olive oil, herbs and spices such as rosemary, sage, bay leaf, oregano, marjoram, cinnamon, clove, nutmeg, and lemon and orange rind. Peasant cooking traditions are based on imaginative variations of several basic ingredients (cereals, dairy products, meat, fish, vegetables, nuts) and cooking procedures (stewing, grilling, roasting, baking), while bourgeois cuisine involves more complicated procedures and use of selected herbs and spices. Charcuterie is part of the Croatian culinary tradition in all regions. Food and recipes from other former Yugoslav countries are also popular in Croatia.

Croatian cuisine can be divided into several distinct cuisines (Dalmatia, Dubrovnik, Gorski Kotar, Istria, Lika,  Međimurje, Podravina, Slavonija, Zagorje) each of which has specific cooking traditions, characteristic of the area and not necessarily well known in other parts of Croatia. Most dishes, however, can be found all across the country, with local variants.

Meat and game

 Specialities from the grill are called s roštilja, those roasted on the spit s ražnja
 pečeno means roasted
 prženo means fried
 pod pekom means that the dish has been put into a stone oven under a metal cover. The cook puts hot coals on the cover so that the meal is cooked slowly in its own juices. Specialties cooked pod pekom include lamb, veal, and octopus.
 na lešo means boiled in broth or water (lamb, beef, fish)

Croatian meat-based dishes include:

Pork 
Miješano meso or Ražnjići (skewers)
Zagrebački odrezak (Veal steaks stuffed with ham and cheese, breaded and fried)
Šnicle (schnitzel) – breaded veal, pork or chicken cutlets
 – pork ham from Međimurje County
Janjetina – roasted lamb garnished with Mediterranean herbs
 Pag lamb (Paška janjetina)
 Dalmatian lamb (Dalmatinska janjetina)
Odojak – roasted suckling pig
Fresh game from Dalmatia
Visovačka begavica
Turkey with mlinci (flat pasta, soaked in roast juices)
Buncek – smoked pork hock, used in bean, sauerkraut or kale stews
Leg of lamb à la Pašticada 
Leg of venison the count's way
Wild duck with sauce
Polpete, ćufte, faširanci – Frikadeller

Roasted pheasant
Kotlovina from Samobor (kettle with knuckle of pork and other meat and sausages)
Boiled fillet of beef haunch with Sauerkraut
Escalope à la Baron Trenk (spicy-rolled Schnitzel)
Međimurje Goose (stuffed with buckwheat)
Turopolje Goose (with corn semolina as a side dish)
Purgerica Turkey (Christmas dish from the bordering region to Zagreb, turkey filled with chestnuts, apples, bacon, lemons, etc.)
Krvavice, or čurke, blood sausages, made of blood and kaša
Hladetina, a particular type of head cheese
Brački vitalac
Edible dormouse

Seafood

Croatian seafood dishes include:

Squid – Croatian: lignje, grilled, fried, stuffed or prepared as stew and served with polenta
Octopus salad – Croatian: salata od hobotnice; octopus can also be prepared brudet style, with red wine, or baked pod pekom
Cuttlefish risotto – Croatian: Crni rižot'
Tuna
Scampi – Croatian: škampiCommon mussels – Croatian: dagnjeSalted cod is imported, but dishes are very popular for Christmas Eve or on Good Friday. It can be prepared either as bakalar na bijelo (Dubrovnik, Dalmatia and Istria, with olive oil and garlic, with or without potatoes), or as bakalar na crveno, in tomato-based stew, with potatoes.
Fish stew – Croatian brodet or brudet (Dubrovnik and Dalmatia), best made with several type of fish (red rascasse, European conger, monkfish, European hake)

Clams
Sea spider salad
Breaded catfish or carp
Grilled sardines or other fish (na gradele)
Salted anchovies or sardine (slana riba) are served as hors d'oeuvres or as a part of light supper with povrće na lešo, salads etc. Buzara (shellfish sautéed in garlic, olive oil, parsley & white wine)
 Date shells or prstaci are part of the traditional cuisine, but in the 20th century their extraction was banned as a measure of ecological protection

Stews
Stewed vegetables with a small amount of meat or sausages (varivo or čušpajz) is perceived as a healthy, traditional meal. Sour cream (in Northern Croatia) or olive oil (on the coast) can be added to the plate just before serving. Stewed meat dishes are often prepared by men in open spaces, following hunting and shepherding traditions. In Dalmatian urban cuisine, spices such as cinnamon and clove, dried plums, dried figs, apples and other fruit are sometimes added to meat stews.

Goulash (Croatian: gulaš, see also Hungarian gulyás)
Grah – pork hock bean stew (often done as grah i zelje – with sauerkraut, or grah s kiselom repom – with pickled turnip strings)
Gregada - seafood stew
Varivo od mahuna – green beans stew
Riblji paprikaš – also called fiš-paprikaš (spicy fish stew from Slavonia, see also Hungarian halászlé)
Slavonska riblja čorba (fish stew from Slavonia)
Brudet (or Brodet) – fish stew
Chicken stew
Rabbit goulash
Ričet, also known as jačmik, orzoIstrian stew (Jota)
Pašta fažol – bean stew with small pasta
Game Čobanac (Shepherd's Stew)
Feines Venison goulash with prunes
Hunter's stew
Wine goulash
Sauerkraut stew
Zelena menestra – traditional cabbage and meat dish – Dubrovnik and surrounding area
Pašticada – Dalmatian beef stew with prunes and dried figs
Tripe stew (tripice, fileki)

 Pasta 

Pasta is one of the most popular food items in Croatian cuisine, especially in the region of Dalmatia. Manistra na pome (pasta with tomato sauce) is a staple. The other popular sauces include creamy mushroom sauce, minced meat sauce and many others. Fresh pasta is added to soups and stews, or prepared with cottage cheese, cabbage, even with walnuts or poppy seed. Potato dough is popular, not only for making  (gnocchi), but also for making plum or cheese dumplings which are boiled, and then quickly fried in breadcrumbs and butter.

 Žganci – cornmeal dish in Slovenian and Northern Croatian cuisine, also known as polenta (palenta, pura) in Istria and Dalmatia
 Gnocchi, often served with pašticada or goulash
 Fuži, a typical pasta from Istria
 Needle macaroni

Štrukli – baked or cooked filled pastry from Zagorje, Zagreb area.
Krpice sa zeljem – pasta with stewed cabbage
Šporki makaruli – traditional pasta with cinnamon-flavored meat sauce, from Dubrovnik and surrounding area

 Soups 

Soup is an integral part of a meal in Croatia and no Sunday family meal or any special occasion will go without it. The most popular soups are broth-based, with added pasta or semolina dumplings. They are usually light in order to leave space for the main course and dessert to follow. However, cream or roux-based soups are also popular, and there are many local variations of traditional soups.
In Dalmatia, fish soup with fish chunks, carrots and rice is commonly served.

Maneštra
Veal soup with smoked meat
Beef broth with vermicelli pasta
Mushroom soup, especially with porcini
Dill soup
Zagorska juha with porcini mushrooms, bacon, sweet pepper
Prežgana juha
Chicken soup

 Side dishes 

Sataraš (sliced and stewed summer vegetables)
Mlinci (typical northwest Croatian roasted flatbread, similar to Caucasian flatbreads)
Đuveč (baked summer vegetables, similar to ratatouille)

Other

Zagrebački odrezak – breaded escalope stuffed with ham and cheese, type of cordon bleu
Punjena paprika – peppers filled with minced meat (Turkish: dolma)
Sarma – Sauerkraut rolls filed with minced pork meat and rice
Arambašići from Sinj – similar to Sarma, but made with finely diced beef and without rice
Lepinje – flat bread
Wild truffles, served on pasta, risotto, or fried eggs (fritaja)
Croatian olive oil (Maslinovo ulje)Paški baškotin – aromatic zwieback (rusk) from the Island of Pag

Potatoes from the region of Lika (Lički krumpir) – high-quality, large, red potatoes
Sauerkraut from the Varaždin region
Cabbage (zelje) from the region of Zagreb
Artichokes with peas or broad beans
Fritaja with asparagus
Gorski kotar filling (pieces of ham with eggs and bread)
Čvarci

Sausages and ham

Kulen (Kulin) – spicy pork sausage from Slavonia
Češnjovka – spicy pork sausage with a harmonious garlic taste from Turopolje
Kobasica – spicy, air-dried or smoked sausage (Hungarian: kolbász)
Salami from Samobor
Švargl from Slavonia

Istrian and Dalmatian Pršut – dry-cured ham
Ćevapčići
Panceta from Dalmatia
Špek from continental Croatia
Kaštradina – smoked mutton or goat meat
Ombolo

Cheese (sir)

Paški sir – sheep's milk cheese from the island of Pag
Farmers' cheese (škripavac) and curd cheese from the regions of Kordun and Lika
Cheese from the Cetina region (Cetinski sir)
Cheese from the Island of Krk (Krčki sir)
Cheese from Međimurje (turoš)
Cheese from Podravina (prga)
Cottage cheese (eaten with cream, vrhnje) from Zagorje (sir i vrhnje, often seen as quintessential Croatian traditional food)

Savoury piesViška pogača is a salted sardine-filled focaccia from the island of Vis.Soparnik is a Dalmatian chard-filled pie.Duvanjska pita, made from thin phyllo dough wraps filled with potato and meat.

Pastry

Pita
Pogača (farmers' bread)
Povitica

Bučnica (summer squash and cottage cheese pie, can be savory or sweet)
Štrukli (made with cottage cheese, sour cream and eggs, can be savory or sweet, boiled or baked)
Zlevanka, simple baked cornmeal pastry with various fillings (e.g. cheese, sour cream, cherries, plum jam, walnuts, nettle)
Varaždinski klipići

Sweets and desserts

Palačinke (crepes) with sweet filling (Hungarian: palacsinta)
Baklava
Kremšnita – 
Šaumšnita – 
Zagorski štrukli – sweet pastry from northern Croatia
Uštipci
Fritule
Knedle – potato dough dumplings, usually filled with plums and rolled into buttered breadcrumbs 
Strudel (Croatian:  or ) with apple or curd cheese fillings
Orahnjača and Makovnjača – sweet breads with walnut or poppy seeds
Croatian honey
Bear's paw
Farmer's cheese (quark) cakes (cream cake)
Krafne, pokladnice – a type of doughnut
Croatian pancakes (with wine and egg sauce)
Šnenokli, paradižot (meringue in custard cream, floating island (dessert))
Almond filled ravioli
Homemade fruit preserves, jams, compotes
Čupavci (lamingtons)

Cakes (kolači)Rožata or Rozata (flan, creme caramel)
Easter pastry PincaKroštule (crunchy, deep-fried pastry)Fritule (deep-fried dough, festive pastry, particularly for Christmas)
Bishop's breadGuglhupf ring cake (Croatian kuglof)Rapska torta (Rab cake)Međimurska gibanica (Međimurje County layer cake with apple, poppyseed, walnut and cottage cheese fillings)Makarana tortaImotska tortaMađarica (Croatian layer cake)

Drinks

Wines

Croatia has two main wine regions: Continental (Kontinetalna) and Coastal (Primorska), which includes the islands. Each of the main regions is divided into sub-regions which are divided yet further into smaller vinogorje, (literally wine hills) and districts. Altogether, there are more than 300 geographically defined wine-producing areas in Croatia.  In parts of Croatia, wine, either red or white, is sometimes consumed mixed in approximately two thirds wine and one third of mineral water.

 Dessert wines 
Sweet Malvazija
Muškat Ottonel (see: Muscat grape)
Prošek

 White wines 
Rajnski Rizling 
Žlahtina
Malvazija
Graševina

 Red wines 
Babić
Plavac Mali 
Postup

Beers (pivo)

Apart from imported beers (Heineken, Tuborg, Gösser, Stella Artois, etc.), there are home-brewed and locally brewed beers in Croatia. A brewery based in Split produces Bavarian Kaltenberg beer by licence of the original brewery in Germany.

Karlovačko: brewed in Karlovac 
Ožujsko: brewed in Zagreb (the name refers to the month of March)Pan
Favorit: from Buzet, Istria
Vukovarsko: from Vukovar
Osječko: from Osijek (oldest brewery in Croatia)
Tars pivo: from the seaport city of Rijeka
Tomislav: dark beer from Zagreb
Velebitsko pivo: brewed near Gospić on the Velebit mountain, the dark beer has been voted best beer by an English beer fan website.

Liqueurs and spirits

Maraschino
Rakija (Croatian name for spirits), commonly made from: Lozovača / Loza (grapes) (it.: Grappa),Travarica (Loza with herbs), Šljivovica (plums), Kruškovac (pears), Drenovac (cherries) 
Pelinkovac 
Orahovac (walnut liqueur) 
Medovina (honey)
Gvirc (as Medovina, only more alcohol).

 Coffee 
Croatia is a country of coffee drinkers (on average 5kg per person annually), not only because it was formerly part of the Austrian-Hungarian Empire, but also because it bordered the former Ottoman Empire. Traditional coffee houses similar to those in Vienna are located throughout Croatia.

 Mineral water 
Regarding its water resources, Croatia has a leading position in Europe. Concerning water quality, Croatian water is greatly appreciated all over the world. Due to a lack of established industries there have also been no major incidents of water pollution.
Jamnica – Winner of the Paris AquaExpo for best mineral water of 2003 
Lipički studenac
Jana – also belongs to Jamnica, best aromatized mineral water (Eauscar 2004)

 Juices and syrups 

Badel
Jamnica 
Maraska

Dona
Vindija juices – Vindi sokovi''
Cedevita 
Zvečevo

Protected products
There are 40 Croatian agricultural and food products whose name is registered in the European Union as a protected designation of origin or a protected designation of geographical origin (European mark of authenticity by the European Commission).

Cheese
 Bjelovarski Kvargl
 Lički škripavac (from Lika)
 Pag cheese (from island Pag)

Honey
 Goranski medun (from Gorski kotar)
 Slavonski med (Slavonian honey)
 Zagorski bagremov med (from Hrvatsko zagorje)

Meat
 Baranjski kulen
 Dalmatinska janjetina (Dalmatian lamb)
 Dalmatinska panceta
 Dalmatinska pečenica
 Dalmatinski pršut
 Drniški pršut
 Istarski pršut (Istrski pršut)
 Lička janjetina (Likan lamb)
 Krčki pršut
 Malostonska kamenica
 Međimursko meso ‘z tiblice
 Meso istarskog goveda – boškarina (Meso istrskega goveda – boškarina; Meat of Istrian cattle – Boškarin)
 Paška janjetina (lamb from Pag)
 Samoborska češnjovka (Samoborska češnofka; smoked saussage from Samobor)
 Slavonski kulen (Slavonski kulin; Slavonian kulen/kulin)
 Zagorski puran (turkey meat from Hrvatsko zagorje)

Fruits and vegetables
 Brački varenik
 Neretvanska mandarina
 Lički krumpir (Likan potato)

Olive oils
 Bračko maslinovo ulje
 Ekstra djevičansko maslinovo ulje Cres
 Korčulansko maslinovo ulje 
 Krčko maslinovo ulje
 Šoltansko maslinovo ulje

Pastry
 Lumblija (aromatic sweet bread)
 Poljički soparnik (Poljički zeljanik or Poljički uljenjak)
 Rudarska greblica
 Varaždinski klipič
 Zagorski mlinci
 Zagorski štrukli (Zagorski štruklji)

Other
 Paška sol (sea salt from island Pag)
 Ogulinsko kiselo zelje/Ogulinski kiseli kupus
 Varaždinsko zelje

See also

 Croatian wine
 Croatian brands

References

Further reading 

 "Hrvatska za stolom – mirisi i okusi Hrvatske", Ivanka Biluš et al., Zagreb:Alfa, Koprivnica: Podravka, 1996, 192 p., illustrated in color, (Biblioteka Anima Croatarum, 2) 
"Hrvatska vina" (Croatian wines), Fazinić Nevenko, Milat Vinko, illustrated, 159 p., 1994, 
"Nova hrvatska kuhinja" (New Croatian cuisine), Davor Butković, Ana Ugarković, Profil international, Zagreb, 2005, 272 p., 
.

 
Mediterranean cuisine
Balkan cuisine